is a post-hardcore/shoegaze trio formed in Kobe, Japan in 2002. They are also popularly known by a shortened form of their name, Masu Dore (マスドレ). They are known for a tightly arranged, guitar-driven style, melodic pop vocals and a high-energy stage presence at their live events.
They have been signed to the Japanese indie rock record label AVOCADO Records since the release of their self-titled EP in January 2008.

History

Early career
Mass of the Fermenting Dregs was formed in 2002 in Kobe, Hyogo Prefecture, with the original all-female lineup of Natsuko Miyamoto, Chiemi Ishimoto and Reiko Gotoh. The name of the band was conceived by simply lining up words the members liked. Following Reiko's departure from the band in October 2007, the band toured with the official lineup of Natsuko and Chiemi, with various musicians serving as a "support drummer". Their breakthrough came at the 2007 "Road to Tarbox Audition" competition held by EMI Japan, which put the band in contact with noted American record producer Dave Fridmann (The Flaming Lips, OK Go) of Tarbox Road Studios. With Fridmann producing, they recorded two tracks, I F A Surfer and Bears (ベアーズ), which appeared on their 2008 self-titled E.P. In 2010, support drummer Yoshino Tsutomu became an official member of the band, prior to the release of their major label debut album.

Departure of Chiemi Ishimoto
In October 2010, it was announced that the band's guitarist of six years, Chiemi Ishimoto, would be leaving the group after completing the band's national tour on 11 December 2010. Her leaving was due to a medical panic disorder. Ishimoto's last performance was held at the Shibuya Club Quattro. Guitarist and lead vocalist Eriko Hashimoto of the band Chatmonchy attended the performance, sharing the enthralling experience of the final performance of "End Roll" on her official blog on her band's official website.

Departure of Yoshino Tsutomu
In December 2011, Yoshino Tsutomu announced that he would be leaving the group for undisclosed reasons. This left Miyamoto as the sole founding and active member of the band.

Dissolution
Though Natsuko Miyamoto, with the help of supporting members, continued to perform as Mass of the Fermenting Dregs through the spring of 2012, on September the 1st of the same year, she officially announced that Mass of the Fermenting Dregs would cease to exist as of that day. As a parting present, Miyamoto shared the last of the works recorded while Tsutomu was still a member. A song titled "たんたんたん" (tantantan) was made available for download through a direct link placed within the page containing the departing letter to the fans on the official M.o.F.D. website.

Reformation (2015–present)
In December the M.o.F.D website started to update, deleting the departing letter on the website. Natsuko Miyamoto sent hints on Twitter about M.o.F.D, and the band was later confirmed to play on the New Year's Q2 Concert, thus confirming the reunion of the band. In May 2016, the band played in three Canadian cities on the "Next Music From Tokyo" concert tour.

On August 1, 2022, the M.o.F.D. website was updated, announcing a new album titled "Awakening:Sleeping." Similar announcements were made on the same day on the band's Instagram account as well as Natsuko Miyamoto's account  with a digital release marked for August 17, 2022, as well as a CD release on October 7. The band also announced that they would be planning to do a European Tour the following year.

Style and influences
The band's sound is often compared to that of other influential Japanese post-hardcore acts, notably NUMBER GIRL (ナンバー・ガール). They are often associated with the alternative/progressive rock act 9mm Parabellum Bullet(キューミリ・パラベラム・バレット), with whom they toured in early 2009.
The English version of the band's website also claims western alternative rock bands Sugar, The Wedding Present, and The Smashing Pumpkins as influences on their songwriting.

Members

Current members
 Natsuko Miyamoto (宮本菜津子) b. 9 April 1983 – bass guitar, vocals
 Isao Yoshino (吉野功) – drums, vocals
 Naoya Ogura (小倉直也) – guitar, vocals

Former members
 Yoshino Tsutomu (吉野功) active 2010–2011 – drums
 Reiko Gotoh (後藤玲子), active 2002–2007 – drums, backing vocals
 Chiemi Ishimoto (石本知恵美) b. 25 March 1984, active 2002–2010 – guitar, backing vocals

Discography
Kirametal (demo) – released 15 Sep 2006, independent

MASS OF THE FERMENTING DREGS  – released 16 Jan 2008, AVOCADO Records

World is Yours  (ワールド イズ ユアーズ　Waarudo Izu Yuaazu) – released 21 January 2009, AVOCADO Records

Hikizuru Beat / Made. (ひきずるビート / まで。　Hikizuru bīto/ made.) – released 2 October 2010, AVOCADO Records

ゼロコンマ、色とりどりの世界  – released 8 April 2010, AVOCADO Records

たんたんたん  – released 9 January 2012 (via official website – download only)

スローモーションリプレイ – released 3 January 2017 7" Vinyl

No New World – released 7 April 2018, independent

Naked Album – released 14 August 2020, independent

Awakening:Sleeping – released 17 August 2022, FLAKE SOUNDS

Citations

External links
 Mass of the Fermenting Dregs Official Site
 Mass of the Fermenting Dregs New Official Diary (Japanese)
 Original Mass of the Fermenting Dregs Official Diary (Japanese)

Japanese post-rock groups
Japanese alternative rock groups
Shoegazing musical groups
Japanese rock music groups
Musical groups from Hyōgo Prefecture